The main organiser of Salzburg 1942, Ehrhardt Post, the Chief Executive of Nazi Grossdeutscher Schachbund, intended to bring together the six strongest players of Germany, the occupied and neutral European countries; world champion Alexander Alekhine, former champion Max Euwe, challenger Paul Keres, former challenger Efim Bogoljubov, winner of European tournament at Munich 1941 Gösta Stoltz, and German champion Paul Felix Schmidt. Euwe withdrew due to "illness". Actually, Euwe refused to participate because Alekhine was invited (Alekhine had written about the "Jewish clique" around Euwe in World Chess Championship 1935). His place was occupied by German sub-champion, the eighteen-years-old Klaus Junge. They made Salzburg 1942 the world's second, after a tournament purporting to be the first European Championship (Europameisterschaft) in Munich, strongest tournament in 1942.

The event took place in the rooms of Mirabell Palace in Salzburg from 9 to 18 June 1942. The players had to make 32 moves in two hours. Thereafter, the tempo became 16 moves per hour.

The final results and standings:

{|class="wikitable" style="margin: 1em auto 1em auto; "
|  style="background:#f0f0f0;"|#
|  style="background:#f0f0f0;"|Player
|  style="background:#f0f0f0;"|Country
|  style="background:#f0f0f0;"|1
|  style="background:#f0f0f0;"|2
|  style="background:#f0f0f0;"|3
|  style="background:#f0f0f0;"|4
|  style="background:#f0f0f0;"|5
|  style="background:#f0f0f0;"|6
|  style="background:#f0f0f0;"|Total
|-
| 1 || Alexander Alekhine || / || xx || 11 || 11 || 01 || 01 || ½ 1 ||  7.5
|-
| 2 || Paul Keres ||     ||  00 || xx || ½½ || 1½ || ½1 || 11 ||  6
|-
| 3-4 || Paul Felix Schmidt || / || 00 || ½½ || xx || ½½  || 01 || 11 ||  5
|-
| 3-4 || Klaus Junge || /  || 10 || 0½ || ½½ || xx || 01  || ½1 ||  5
|-
| 5 || Efim Bogoljubov || / || 10 || ½0 || 10  || 10 || xx || 00 ||  3.5
|-
| 6 || Gösta Stoltz ||   || ½0 || 00 || 00 || ½0 || 11 || xx ||  3
|}

Aftermath

Klaus Junge was a lieutenant of the 12th SS Battalion defending Hamburg. Refusing to surrender, he died – shouted "Sieg Heil!" – in combat against Allied troops on 17 April 1945 in the battle of Welle on the Lüneburger Heide.
The first Junge Memorial was held in Regensburg in 1946 (Fedor Bohatirchuk won). According to Dr Robert Hübner, Klaus Junge was the greatest German chess talent in the 20th century.

Alexander Alekhine moved to Spain in 1943. The chess world did not forget his Nazi articles published in 1941, although negotiations with Mikhail Botvinnik for a world title match were proceeding in 1946 when Alekhine died in Estoril, Portugal, in unclear circumstances. Some have speculated that he was murdered by a French "Death Squad". A few years later, Alekhine's son, Alexander Alekhine Junior, said that "the hand of Moscow reached his father".

Efim Bogoljubov lived in West Germany and remained active in the German chess world. After World War II, he won – among others – at Bad Pyrmont 1949 (Western zone championship), played at Southsea 1950, Birmingham 1951, and Belgrade 1952. Bogoljubov was awarded the title International Grandmaster by the World Chess Federation FIDE in 1951. He died from a heart attack in Triberg in 1952.

Paul Keres travelled to Spain in 1943 and moved to Sweden in 1944. At the end of World War II, he returned to Estonia in Autumn 1944. He was harassed by the Soviet authorities (KGB) and feared for his life. Fortunately, Keres managed to avoid deportation to Siberia or any worse fate (e.g., that of Vladimirs Petrovs) – a letter to Viacheslav Molotov spared his life – but his return to the international chess scene was delayed, in spite of his excellent form. He returned to international play in World Chess Championship 1948 but, as some historians argue, had to lose to Mikhail Botvinnik. Keres died from a heart attack in Helsinki in 1975.

Gösta Stoltz returned to Sweden in 1942. The chess world held no grudge against him and he was invited for Groningen 1946 chess tournament. Stoltz was awarded the International Master title in 1950, and the Grandmaster title in 1954. He died in his country in 1963.

Paul Felix Schmidt remained active in the German chess world. He was awarded the International Master title in 1950. Paul F. Schmidt earned a PhD in chemistry from Heidelberg University in 1951, and moved to Canada, then to the United States, settling in Philadelphia, where he took a job as a professor. He died in Allentown in 1984.

References

Chess competitions
Chess in Austria
1942 in chess
1942 in Austrian sport
Sports in Salzburg